Lake Roosevelt is a lake in Cass County and Crow Wing County, Minnesota, in the United States.

Roosevelt Lake was named for Theodore Roosevelt, 26th President of the United States.

See also
List of lakes in Minnesota

References

Lakes of Minnesota
Lakes of Cass County, Minnesota
Lakes of Crow Wing County, Minnesota